The Minister of Water and Irrigation is the head of the Ministry of Water and Irrigation of the Government of Tanzania.

History
The water portfolio has over the years been part of a number of other ministries.

List of Ministers
The following have served the ministry:
 Parties

References

External links